Wang Mai may refer to:

 Wang Mai, one of the Thai names of Windsor Palace (Bangkok)
 Wang Mai Subdistrict in Pathum Wan District, Bangkok
 Wang Mai Subdistrict in Mueang Chumphon District
 Wang Mai Subdistrict in Pa Bon District, Phatthalung Province
 Wang Mai Subdistrict in Wang Sombun District, Sa Kaeo Province